Mandalakkottai is a village in the Orathanadu taluk of Thanjavur district, Tamil Nadu, India.

Demographics 

As per the 2001 census, Mandalakkottai had a total population of 1090 with 518 males and 572 females. The sex ratio was 1104. The literacy rate was 62.81.

References 

 

Villages in Thanjavur district